FK Visaginas (also previously Interas-AE) is a Lithuanian football team from Visaginas.

Before 2006, the club was fully amateur and many players of the team worked in an atomic plant.

The club was promoted to Lithuanian A Lyga 2007 season and completely revamped its squad, mostly taking players on loan from FC Vilnius.

But after a disastrous season the club failed to acquire A lyga license and was also denied participation in LFF I Lyga.

Participation in Lithuanian Championships
 2003 – 3rd (2 Lyga East)
 2004 – 2nd (2 Lyga South)
 2005 – 2nd (2 Lyga South)
 2006 – 8th (I Lyga)

Football clubs in Lithuania
2007 establishments in Lithuania
Association football clubs established in 2007